VP-Info is a database language and compiler for the personal computer. VP-Info was a competitor to the Clipper and dBase applications in the late 1980s and 1990s. VP-Info runs on MS-DOS, DR-DOS and the PC-MOS/386 operating system.   The last release of VP-Info was named Shark.

Origin

In the early 1980s, David Clark met George Gratzer, a mathematics professor at the University of Manitoba, at ComputerLand in Winnipeg where Gratzer was looking for someone who could program in dBase.  Clark had been using dBase II, but was frustrated by its limitations for reporting on more than 2 tables at a time. While working for Standard Knitting (a client of Gratzer's and Clark's), David wrote a report generator called dComp that would allow up to six related data files to be in use at one time and run faster than the slow, dBase II. Clark and Gratzer subsequently formed a partnership in a company called "Sub Rosa" that developed dComp into a full dBase II compatible language/database called Max that had more speed and "power tools" than even dBase III contained. Clark designed and developed the program while Gratzer wrote the reference and tutorial manuals. This product was published by Paperback Software and sold over 30,000 copies (worldwide) in 1987 alone. The published reference manual for VP-Info was over 900 pages and the program was distributed in an extra thick back cover which was an innovation for all Paperback Software products at that time.

For programmers, Max had several interesting capabilities, including the ability to change field names easily, to represent fields in array form, automatically execute code while moving from field to field and many tools like cross tabs. With its built-in editor, a programmer could go from edit to executing the program in 2 keystrokes and back to editing the program with just 2 more.

Marketing
Paperback Software International Ltd. acquired worldwide marketing rights to Max and launched it as VP-Info in 1986. Lotus Development Corp. objected to some of the features of VP-Planner 3D, a Lotus look-alike with a number of features beyond those of 1-2-3, and sued Paperback Software for copyright infringement in 1989. Though the lawsuit ultimately failed in the courts, Paperback Software eventually folded following the litigations.

Sub Rosa Inc. reacquired worldwide distribution rights to VP-Info shortly before it entered bankruptcy. Bursten and an associate, Bernie Melman of Toronto, established Sub Rosa Publishing Inc. in Toronto and Sub Rosa Corporation in Minneapolis and attempted to get VP-Info back into distribution. Since the name belonged to the bankrupt Paperback Software, however, they had to give it yet another name, and Shark (or Sharkbase) was introduced in 1992 as an upgrade to VP-Info.

Technical
VP-Info can read and write all the common dBase/Clipper file formats, as well as exchange data with OpenOffice.  VP-Info can read and write any type of dbf files (e.g. dBase II, III, IV, Clipper) at the same time.  Unlike the older dBase file formats, VP-Info dbf files can have an unlimited number of records. VP-Info has a built-in compiler for fast execution.

Like many DOS applications, VP-Info is available for free download. An online User's Manual for the latest distribution of VP-Info, SharkBase, is still maintained.  VP-Info, and subsequent SharkBase versions, can run on 32-bit or 64-bit Windows, using a virtual machine or emulator to provide a usable environment. It has been reported that both VP-Info and Shark run under the latest Windows versions using vDOS, a fork of the DOSBox MS-DOS emulator, and it can also run on multi-user/multi-tasking systems with NetBIOS over TCP/IP such as vDOS.  VP-Info dbf files can be opened, modified and saved by both OpenOffice Calc and LibreOffice Calc.  The vDOS emulator offers access to all hardware output (printer) ports on the hosting Windows system, unlike DOSbox.

References

Proprietary database management systems
1986 software